The Shamrock and the Rose is a 1927 American silent comedy film directed by Jack Nelson and starring Mack Swain, Olive Hasbrouck, and Edmund Burns. 

It was one of a series of film presenting inter-community romance between Irish Americans and Jewish Americans.

Plot
On the East Side of New York City, feuding families the Cohens and the Kellys own an ice cream and a hot dog stand respectively, but their children have fallen in love.

Cast

References

Bibliography
 Ruth Barton. Irish National Cinema. Routledge, 2004. 
 Donald W. McCaffrey & Christopher P. Jacobs. Guide to the Silent Years of American Cinema. Greenwood Publishing, 1999.

External links
 

1927 films
1927 comedy films
1920s English-language films
American black-and-white films
Silent American comedy films
American silent feature films
Christian and Jewish interfaith dialogue
Films directed by Jack Nelson
Films set in New York City
1920s American films
English-language comedy films